Pain Medicine is a peer-reviewed medical journal covering pain management. It was established in 2000 and is published twelve times per year by Oxford University Press. It is the official journal of the American Academy of Pain Medicine and the Faculty of Pain Medicine of the Australian and New Zealand College of Anaesthetists. The editor-in-chief is Robert W. Hurley (Wake Forest University). According to the journal's website, the journal has an impact factor of 3.637, and a 5-year impact factor of 3.721.

References

External links
 

Anesthesiology and palliative medicine journals
Wiley-Blackwell academic journals
Publications established in 2000
English-language journals
Academic journals associated with learned and professional societies